State Highway 76 (SH 76) is a state highway in Christchurch, New Zealand. This highway was gazetted in 2012 after stage 1 of the Christchurch Southern Motorway was completed. Beforehand, much of SH 76 was part of SH 73 and included the former two-lane Christchurch Arterial Motorway, which was upgraded to four lanes. SH 76 includes the entire length of the Christchurch Southern Motorway and forms the most direct route from the south of Christchurch to the city centre and Lyttelton.

Route
The highway currently begins at a grade separated intersection with SH 74 on the northern approach to the Lyttelton road tunnel. It travels east to west through suburban Christchurch via Port Hills Road, Opawa Road and Brougham Street. This section of road used to be part of SH 73 and the speed limit is mostly . At the western end of Brougham Street at the Collins Street/Simeon Street lights, the Christchurch Southern Motorway commences. Midway up the motorway is the Curletts Road interchange, a major interchange where two state highways commence: SH 75 to Akaroa via Banks Peninsula and SH 73 to the West Coast via Arthur's Pass.

The motorway continues west for 7.5 kilometres, passing under the Halswell Junction Road and Shands Road interchanges, eventually terminating at SH 1 just north of Rolleston.

Major intersections

Future
As part of the government's Roads of National Significance, stage 2 of the Christchurch Southern Motorway commenced construction in October 2016. This extended SH 76 to terminate with SH 1 further west near the intersection of Robinsons Road.

See also
List of New Zealand state highways

References

76
Transport in Canterbury, New Zealand